Halolimnohelicidae is a family of air-breathing land snails, terrestrial pulmonate gastropod mollusks in the superfamily Helicoidea (according to the taxonomy of the Gastropoda by Bouchet & Rocroi, 2005). This family has no subfamilies.

Genera 
Genera within the family Halolimnohelicidae include:
 Halolimnohelix Germain, 1913 - type genus

References

External links